The Blind cave loach (Nemacheilus troglocataractus) is a species of troglobitic stone loach endemic to Thailand. It is only known from one subterranean stream in the Sai Yok Noi cave, which also is inhabited by Pterocryptis buccata. The blind cave loach has no eyes and lacks pigmentation. It grows to  SL. Despite its common name, there are several other species of blind cave-living loaches.

References

T
Cave fish
Fish of Thailand
Endemic fauna of Thailand
Fish described in 1989
Taxonomy articles created by Polbot